Timeline (Thai: Timeline จดหมาย ความทรงจำ) is romantic-comedy-drama Thai film created by Sahamongkol Film and this is a second episode of The Letter. The film grossed 51.8 million baht.

Plot 
Tan (Jirayu Tangsrisuk) is a teenager who wanted to experience the outside world. He lives in Chiang Mai with his mother but he is bored with his life, therefore he determines to study in Bangkok.

Life in the new world, with all new things around and different from the old world, causes "Tan" to meet "June"(Jarinporn Joonkiat) a new friend that has a different way of thinking and looking at the world. She is the only who supports him in hisendeavors and gives him inspiration. But Tan falls in love with June's sister, Orn. June decides to continue her further studies in Japan.

She can't accept it because Tan and her sister are the one that she loves. Later, Tan breaks up with Orn. Then, he writes a letter to June expressing his love. He knows that he loves her but it is too late. She dies after she gets the letter from Tan. By accident, she drowns when she tries to help a Japanese boy. Tan is broken hearted. He decides to do what June wanted to do, which is to travel around the world.

Cast 
 Jirayu Tangsrisuk as Tan
 Jarinporn Joonkiat as June
 Piyatida Mitteeraroj as Mut
 Noppachai Chaiyanam as Wat
 Adisorn Aadtakit as Tun
 Aratee Tunmahapan as Orn
 Chayapon Panhakan as Pang
 Yongsin Wongpanitnont as Tan (childhood)

Soundtrack 
 How Much Further is Near? (ไกลแค่ไหนคือใกล้) by Jirayu Tangsrisuk / Jarinporn Joonkiat
 The question that no answer (คำถามซึ้งไร้คำตอบ) by Jirayu Tangsrisuk

External links
 

2014 films
Thai romantic comedy-drama films